Alfonso Fiorentino (1924 – 22 June 2007) was an Argentine weightlifter. He competed in the men's featherweight event at the 1948 Summer Olympics.

References

1924 births
2007 deaths
Argentine male weightlifters
Olympic weightlifters of Argentina
Weightlifters at the 1948 Summer Olympics
Place of birth missing